Dariush Kashani is an American film, stage and television actor. Kashani gained critical acclaim for his role as Hassan Asfour in the 2017 Tony Award winning production of the Broadway play Oslo which went on to include a full sweep of the 2016-2017 awards season including the Lucille Lortel Award and the Outer Critics Circle Award for Outstanding New Broadway Play. Kashani also earned an Obie award along with company of Oslo for his work in the Off Broadway production at Lincoln Center. Other stage credits include the Broadway musical The Band’s Visit, The Invisible Hand at New York Theatre Workshop and the Tony Kushner play Homebody/Kabul alongside Maggie Gyllenhaal at the Brooklyn Academy of Music. On March 1, 2018 Kashani assumed the lead role in the Broadway musical The Band’s Visit. Kashani also appeared in the AMC series Dietland. Other notable works on screen include Bobby Tooch on Ghost Whisperer and Minister Tousi in Madam Secretary.

Kashani will star as Rahim Khan in the upcoming 2022 Broadway premiere of The Kite Runner.

Early life

Kashani was born in Iran and moved to the United States at the age of 9. Kashani is a classically trained actor who received a MFA in Acting from the Mason Gross School of the Arts at Rutgers University

Select filmography

References

External links

Living people
21st-century American male actors
Obie Award recipients
Year of birth missing (living people)
Male actors from Tehran